Tamagawa (written:  or ) is a Japanese surname. Notable people with the surname include:

, Ryukyuan prince
, Japanese actor
, Japanese voice actress
, Japanese mathematician

Japanese-language surnames